The Florence Methodist Church is a historic church in Florence, South Dakota. It was built in 1908 and was added to the National Register in 1991.

It is vernacular in style but based on the Akron Plan.

References

Methodist churches in South Dakota
Churches on the National Register of Historic Places in South Dakota
Churches completed in 1908
Churches in Codington County, South Dakota
National Register of Historic Places in Codington County, South Dakota
1908 establishments in South Dakota